Isaac Adams may refer to:

 Isaac Adams (inventor) (1802–1883), American inventor and politician in the Massachusetts Senate
 Isaac Adams Jr. (1836–1911), his son, also an American inventor, a.k.a. Dr. Adams
 Isaac Adams (Maine politician) (1773–1834), politician from Portland, Maine
 Isaac Adams (Wisconsin politician) (1825–1879), American farmer and politician